Ajay Varma (born 26 December 1963) is an Indian former cricketer. An all-rounder, he had healthy batting and bowling averages throughout his 12-year career for Bengal.

References

Living people
1963 births
Indian cricketers
Bengal cricketers
Cricketers from Thiruvananthapuram